The 2011 AAA Texas 500 was a NASCAR Sprint Cup Series event held on November 6, 2011 at Texas Motor Speedway in Fort Worth, Texas. Contested over 334 laps, the event was the eighth race in the Chase for the Sprint Cup during the 2011 NASCAR Sprint Cup Series season. Tony Stewart led 173 of the 334 laps and won the race while Carl Edwards and Kasey Kahne finished second and third respectively. The race featured five cautions and twenty-three lead changes, while Stewart's win was his fourth of the season and second in a row after winning the previous week's race as well. Before the race, Kyle Busch was suspended by NASCAR due to his actions in the 2011 WinStar World Casino 350K. He was replaced by Michael McDowell.

The race was filmed for footage for the British motor show Top Gear, where presenter Richard Hammond was shown walking around the Texas Motor Speedway campgrounds, being the honorary pace car driver, and being a pit crew member for Mark Martin's team. Afterwards, Hammond would get a ride with Kyle Petty for the Petty Racing Experience.

Entry list

Qualifying 

*Qualified by time.

**Qualified by being Top 35 in Owner's Points.

Race recap

Pre-race 
For pre-race ceremonies, Dr. Roger Marsh from Texas Alliance Raceway Ministries gave the invocation. Showdog Recording artist Trace Adkins would sing the national anthem, with a singular B-52 Bomber from the Barksdale Air Force Base performing the flyover. The president of Texas' AAA branch at the time, Bob Bouttier, gave the command to start engines.

Honorary pace car driver, former Top Gear host and now host of The Grand Tour, Richard Hammond would lead the field to green.

Race results

References

AAA Texas 500
AAA Texas 500
2010s in Fort Worth, Texas
NASCAR races at Texas Motor Speedway
November 2011 sports events in the United States